Steven Geltz (born November 1, 1987) is an American former professional baseball pitcher. He played in Major League Baseball (MLB) for the Los Angeles Angels of Anaheim and the Tampa Bay Rays.

Amateur career
Geltz was born in Newfane, New York to Roxanne, a registered nurse, and John, an electrician. Geltz was raised in Ransomville, New York, a small town with merely 1,400 inhabitants. Geltz attended Wilson High School in Wilson, New York. Only 5'9" as a senior in high school, Geltz was overlooked by most college baseball programs and all Major League Baseball clubs despite his talents as a pitcher, and attended nearby University at Buffalo.

Professional career

Los Angeles Angels
Geltz signed with the Los Angeles Angels of Anaheim as an undrafted free agent in 2008 out of the University at Buffalo and was assigned to the Orem Owlz.

Geltz was called up to the majors for the first time on August 10, 2012.

Tampa Bay Rays
Before the 2013 season, the Angels traded Geltz to the Tampa Bay Rays for pitcher Dane De La Rosa. Geltz spent all of 2013 in the International League with the Durham Bulls.

In May 2014, Geltz received a 50-game suspension without pay after testing positive for a drug of abuse for the second time in his career in violation of the Minor League Drug Prevention and Treatment Program. The positive test was a result of recreational marijuana use during the offseason.

Geltz pitched his first full Major League season in 2015. On April 14, Geltz faced four Toronto Blue Jays batters and got four outs for his first Major League win. On April 22 against the Boston Red Sox, Geltz picked up his first save in the Major Leagues. Geltz set a Rays franchise record later in the season by retiring 32 batters in a row. He lost the streak on June 24 by allowing an extra-inning single to Ezequiel Carrera.

Milwaukee Brewers
Geltz was claimed off waivers by the Milwaukee Brewers on November 28, 2016. He was outrighted to the minors on December 3 and elected to become a free agent the following day.

Los Angeles Dodgers
Geltz signed with the Los Angeles Dodgers in 2017 and was assigned to the Triple-A Oklahoma City Dodgers to begin the season. In 23 games he was 2–2 with a 2.67 ERA.

Philadelphia Phillies
On January 2, 2018, Geltz signed a minor league deal with the Philadelphia Phillies. Before the 2018 season, he was suspended 100 games for his third positive test for a drug of abuse. Geltz was released by the organization on August 15, 2018.

References

External links

1987 births
Living people
Los Angeles Angels players
Tampa Bay Rays players
Buffalo Bulls baseball players
Orem Owlz players
Arizona League Angels players
Rancho Cucamonga Quakes players
Arkansas Travelers players
Salt Lake Bees players
Durham Bulls players
Mesa Solar Sox players
Major League Baseball pitchers
Baseball players from New York (state)
Major League Baseball players suspended for drug offenses
Oklahoma City Dodgers players